Personal Demon, a fantasy novel published in 2008, is the eighth book in the Women of the Otherworld series written by Canadian author Kelley Armstrong.  It is the first novel in the series to have more than one narrator and the first to include a male narrator.

Plot introduction
Half-demon tabloid reporter Hope Adams has a secret.  Like full demons, she loves chaos.  She thrives on it.  She needs it. 
Most of the time, Hope feeds the hunger by helping the interracial council.  But it's never enough.  So when Benicio Cortez offers her a job infiltrating a gang of young supernaturals, she thinks she's found the perfect solution.  Instead, she finds a tinderbox of greed, desire and ambition.  And when it ignites, a world is going to explode

Plot summary

The initial story is mainly narrated by Hope Adams an Expiso half-demon with other events being narrated by Lucas Cortez, a sorcerer.  In the latter parts of the story the narrating is more evenly distributed between the two characters.  Chapters narrated by Hope are given chapter titles while those narrated by Lucas are given chapter numbers.

Hope Adams works as a tabloid journalist for the fictional newspaper True News and also for the inter-racial council.  Hope's Expiso half-demon nature gives her the ability to sense other supernatural's powers, detect chaos and experience visions of chaotic events.  While investigating a story she is approached by Benicio Cortez, CEO of the Cortez cabal and father of Lucas Cortez, with an offer of a job which would repay Hope's debt to him.

A rebel gang of young supernaturals led by Guy Benoit has come to notice of the Cortez cabal.  The job offer is simple - to investigate the rebel gang.  But the bigger worry is if Hope will be able to keep her instinct and lust for chaos in check.  As Hope discovers more about the gang and starts a relationship with a particularly charismatic member Jaz, her ex lover, the werewolf thief Karl Marsten, arrives to help and honour his half of the debt.  The two find the situation may not be as simple as they thought.

With Hope infiltrating the gang, two members of the gang are abducted and a third killed, apparently by the Cortez cabal.  This prompts Lucas Cortez and Paige Winterbourne to come to Miami to help Hope and Karl before a war between the rebels and the cabal can destroy them all.

Characters in "Personal Demon"

Major Characters
 Hope Adams - Expiso half-demon.  Works for interracial council and as a tabloid reporter.
 Lucas Cortez - Sorcerer and future heir of Cortez cabal.  Lives in Portland and runs an agency helping supernaturals with wife Paige Winterbourne and adopted daughter Savannah Levine.
 Karl Marsten - Hereditary werewolf. Extremely wealthy professional thief and has recently joined the Pack.
 Paige Winterbourne - Witch and member of the interracial council.  Ex leader of the American Coven, currently works with husband Lucas and adopted daughter Savannah at their agency to help supernaturals.
 Benicio Cortez - Sorcerer and CEO of Cortez cabal. Father of Hector, William, Carlos and Lucas

Minor Characters
 Savannah Levine - Witch.  Adopted daughter of Lucas and Paige.
 Guy Benoit - Sorcerer.  Leader of rebel gang of supernaturals in Miami.
 Jasper "Jaz" Haig - Shapeshifter (previously unknown race).  Member of rebel gang in Miami.  Brother of Sonny.
 Jason "Sonny" Haig - Shapeshifter (previously unknown race). Member of rebel gang in Miami.  Brother of Jaz.
 Hector Cortez- Sorcerer, executive in Cortez cabal, son of Benicio.
 William Cortez- Sorcerer, executive in Cortez cabal, son of Benicio.
 Carlos Cortez- Sorcerer, executive in Cortez cabal, son of Benicio.
 Troy Morgan - Tempestras half-demon bodyguard to Benicio Cortez
 Griffin - Ferratus half-demon bodyguard of Benicio Cortez

Release details
Released in hardback in March 2008.
Due for release in paperback October 2008

References

External links
 Author's Official Website

Novels by Kelley Armstrong
2008 Canadian novels